Guanabacoa is a colonial township in eastern Havana, Cuba, and one of the 15 municipalities (or boroughs) of the city. It is famous for its historical Santería and is home to the first African Cabildo in Havana. Guanabacoa was briefly the capital of Cuba in 1555 after Havana was attacked by French pirate Jacques de Sores. This gave rise to the Cuban saying “Like putting Havana in Guanabacoa,” which is used to describe trying fit something too large into a space too small. Guanabacoa was the site of the Battle of Guanabacoa, a skirmish between British and Spanish troops during the Battle of Havana during the Seven Years' War.

Overview

The town of Guanabacoa is situated in the province of La Havana, some five kilometers (3.2 miles) to the southeast of La Havana (city) and south of the city of Regla. It rests on a small hill bordered by rivers.

Guanabacoa was also the home of a small community of Florida Indians, mostly Apalachees and Yamasees, who, along with Spanish forces, were evacuated from Florida in 1764, following the conclusion of the Seven Years' War.

The Jewish Community
It is unknown when the Jewish Community developed in the town of Guanabacoa. In the late 1920s Samuel Epstein, owner of Aetna Knitted Fabrics from New York’s Lower East Side, established Sedanita  in rented facilities in Guanabacoa. The company imported $75,000 worth of equipment for the production of underwear, shawls, and scarves; it employed 200 workers. But, Jewish-owned businesses do not constitute a Jewish community. Sedanita moved to San José de las Lajas after it was sold to the Brandon family evidently in the late 1930s.

It is clear that earlier there were other Jewish-owned light manufacturing plants in Guanabacoa as well. In the 1930s these included the factory of Charles Shapiro. From available evidence Shapiro’s business went well. After Sedanita moved out, Shapiro bought the building that the Epstein’s rented, and used it to expand his own knitting and dying company.

By the 1940s there was a Jewish Community in Guanabacoa headquartered in the Centro Israelita at Calle Martí 252. There was also a WIZO branch. Records of the founding of the community are missing.

The Guanabacoa community apparently was business-oriented, and basing a community upon businesses is problematic. Even during the 1950s the Jewish community in Guanabacoa was in decline. It was one of the early casualties of emigration after the Castro Revolution.

Notable people
Four personalities of Cuban music were born in this town: Ernesto Lecuona, Rita Montaner, Ignacio Villa (Bola de Nieve), and the composer, writer and actress Dinorah Rivas, some of her compositions were played by famous musicians and singers such as Tito Puente and Milly Puente. 
  
Four Major League Baseball players were also born here: Emilio Palmero (1895), Tony Ordeñana (1918), Rene Valdez (1929), and Evelio Hernández (1931), as well as the television news reporter Rick Sanchez.

The township was also the childhood home of Cuban singer, Lucrecia Saez Perez, hailed by many as a successor to the great Celia Cruz, and “The Myth,” bodybuilder Sergio Oliva.

The famous journalist, historian and writer María Argelia Vizcaíno was also born in Guanabacoa. She is the author of "Guanabacoa la Bella, Tomo I" (2006) among others. For more information about the author go to: María Argelia Vizcaíno

Climate
This area  typically has a pronounced dry season.  According to the Köppen Climate Classification system, Guanabacoa has a tropical savanna climate, abbreviated "Aw" on climate maps.

References

External links

 Guanabacoa (town's history prior to 1960)

Jews and Judaism in Cuba
Municipalities of Havana